Marta Bianchi (born 25 October 1943) is an Argentine comic-dramatic actress of cinema, theater and television.

Biography
Bianchi is an actress who was characterized by her versatility and professionalism with which she performed her interpretations in film, theater and television. She is a graduate of the "National School of Dramatic Art".

In 1974, she received threats together with her then husband, the actor Luis Brandoni by Triple A. After being exiled for a time in Mexico, they returned to the country. On 9 July 1976, when they left the theater, together with Spanish actor Miguel Gila, a task force coordinated by Aníbal Gordon was waiting for them to take them to the clandestine center Automotores Orletti, where they remained for about five hours, until they were released. Gila spoke to Emilio Alfaro, and convinced Army General Arturo Corbetta to release them.

Career

Television
On the small screen Bianchi made her debut in 1963 with the company of Narciso Ibáñez Menta. She worked with greats such as Luisina Brando, Bárbara Mujica, Miguel Ángel Solá, Julio de Grazia, Brandoni, Ricardo Darín, Rodolfo Ranni, María Valenzuela, Mirta Busnelli, Selva Alemán, Marta González, Virginia Lago, Hilda Bernard and Erika Wallner.

Film
In cinema, Bianchi has a long career in which she shared scenes with actors of the stature of Héctor Alterio, Soledad Silveyra, Brandoni, Alicia Bruzzo, Graciela Borges, Lautaro Murúa, Enzo Viena, Arturo García Buhr, Ulises Dumont, Moria Casán, Thelma Stefani, Antonio Gasalla, Carlos Perciavalle, Pepe Soriano, Arturo Bonín and Patricio Contreras, among many others.

Stage
Bianchi worked in numerous theatrical works in places such as the Teatro Abierto, Teatro General San Martín, Teatro Argentino, Teatro Payro and Teatro Universal.

Personal life
Bianchi was married for more than 20 years to actor Luis Brandoni with whom she had her daughters Florencia and Micaela.

Filmography 

1963: El sátiro (TV Mini Series, 5 episodes)
1963: Racconto
1965: Show Rambler (TV Movie)
1967: La muchacha del cuerpo de oro
1968: Chúmbale
1969: Sátiro (TV Mini Series, 15 episodes)
1970: Uno entre nosotros (TV Series, 19 episodes)
1970: Gran teatro universal (TV Series, 1 episode)
1970: Años de amor y coraje (TV Series, 19 episodes)
1971: Teatro 13 (TV Series, 1 episode)
1971: Cuatro hombres para Eva (TV Series, 29 episodes)
1970-1971: Alta comedia (TV Series, 2 episodes)
1972: Basuras humanas
1972: Autocine mon amour
1973: Piel de pueblo (TV Series, 3 episodes)
1973: José María y María José: Una pareja de hoy
1974: Clínica con música
1976: Alone
1980: Hombres en pugna (TV Movie)
1981: Los especiales de ATC (TV Series, 1 episode)
1982: El mundo del espectáculo (TV Series, 1 episode)
1982: El ciclo de Guillermo Bredeston y Nora Cárpena (TV Series, 1 episode)
1984: Los gringos (TV Mini Series, 19 episodes)
1984: La rosales
1984: Murder in the Senate
1985: There's Some Guys Downstairs
1987: Made in Argentina
1988: De fulanas y menganas (TV Series)
1990: La bonita página (TV Series, 1 episode)
1993-1996: Mi cuñado (TV Series, 248 episodes)
1996: Como pan caliente (TV Series, 39 episodes)
1996: A Casa de Açúcar
1999: Champions of Life (TV Series)
2001: Las amantes (TV Series, 19 episodes)
2004: Cuentos clásicos de terror (TV Series 2004, 1 episode)
2008: Killer Women (TV Series, 1 episode)
2008: Oportunidades (TV Movie)
2009: Campo Cerezo
2010: It's Your Fault
2012: El Tabarís, lleno de estrellas (TV Movie)

References

External links 
 

1943 births
Living people
Actresses from Buenos Aires
Argentine film actresses
Argentine stage actresses
Argentine television actresses